Marco Hangl (born 20 April 1967) is a Swiss former alpine skier who competed in the 1992 Winter Olympics and 1994 Winter Olympics.

External links
 sports-reference.com

1967 births
Living people
Swiss male alpine skiers
Olympic alpine skiers of Switzerland
Alpine skiers at the 1992 Winter Olympics
Alpine skiers at the 1994 Winter Olympics
Place of birth missing (living people)
20th-century Swiss people